The 2006 NCAA Skiing Championships were contested at the Steamboat Ski Resort on Mount Werner near Steamboat Springs, Colorado as part of the 53rd annual NCAA-sanctioned ski tournament to determine the individual and team national champions of men's and women's collegiate slalom and cross-country skiing in the United States.

Hosts Colorado, coached by Richard Rokos, won the team championship, the Buffaloes' fifth co-ed title and sixteenth overall.

Venue

This year's NCAA skiing championships were contested at the Steamboat Ski Resort at Mount Werner in Steamboat Springs, Colorado.

Program

Men's events
 Cross country, 20 kilometer freestyle
 Cross country, 10 kilometer classical
 Slalom
 Giant slalom

Women's events
 Cross country, 15 kilometer freestyle
 Cross country, 5 kilometer classical
 Slalom
 Giant slalom

Team scoring

 DC – Defending champions
 Debut team appearance

See also
 List of NCAA skiing programs

References

2006 in sports in Colorado
NCAA Skiing Championships
2006 in alpine skiing
2006 in cross-country skiing
NCAA Skiing Championships
College sports in Colorado
Skiing in Colorado